Vadodara International Cricket Stadium is a cricket stadium proposed to be built in Vadodara, Gujarat. The stadium will be the home ground for Baroda Cricket Association. .

In January 2015, Memorandum of Understanding was signed between Government of Gujarat and Baroda Cricket Association for stadium and will be located at Kotambi on the outskirts of Vadodara with cost of Rs. 100 crores to develop 29 acres of land.

References

Cricket grounds in Gujarat
Sport in Vadodara
Buildings and structures in Vadodara
Stadiums under construction
Proposed sports venues in India
Proposed stadiums